The 1980–81 Alliance Premier League season was the second season of the Alliance Premier League. Altrincham were the winners of their second Alliance Premier League title.

New team(s) in the league this season
 Frickley Athletic (promoted 1979–80)

League table

Results

Tops scorers

Promotion and relegation

Promoted
 Dagenham (from the Isthmian League Premier Division)
 Dartford (from the Southern League Southern Division)
 Enfield (from the Isthmian League Premier Division)
 Runcorn (from the Northern Premier League)
 Trowbridge Town (from the Southern League Midland Division)

Relegated
 Bangor City (to the Northern Premier League)
 Nuneaton Borough (to the Southern League Midland Division)
 Wealdstone (to the Southern League Southern Division)

Election to the Football League
As winners of the Alliance Premier League Altrincham won (for the second season running) the right to apply for election to the Football League to replace one of the four bottom sides in the 1980–81 Football League Fourth Division. The vote went as follows:

As a result of this, Altrincham did not gain membership of the Football League.

References

External links
 1980–81 Football Conference Results
 Re-election Results – The Division Four final league table, including the results of the re-election vote.

National League (English football) seasons
5